Shiraz Shivji (born 1947 in what is now Tanzania) was the primary designer of the 1985 Atari ST computer, and one of the engineers of the Commodore 64.

Biography
Shiraz Shivji, born 1947 in what is now Tanzania, was of Indian Ismaili heritage. He was interested in electronics from an early age in what is now Tanzania. He was educated in the United Kingdom, where he obtained a first-class honours degree at the University of Southampton. He then moved to the United States, where he obtained a master's degree in electrical engineering at Stanford University during 1969–1973.

Commodore 
Shivji began work at Silicon Valley, and found work at Commodore International, where he was one of the engineers that helped build the Commodore 64. By 1984, he had been promoted to being the director of engineering at Commodore. 

In 1984, Shivji was involved in a scandal related to his work on the Commodore 900. He was one of three systems engineers on the project since its inception in 1983. He was sued by Commodore in mid-July 1984 for disclosing confidential research information connected to this project and disk drive design plans as he was beginning to transfer to Atari Corporation with Jack Tramiel. He was acquitted of all charges in court alongside several other engineers.

Atari Corporation 
When Jack Tramiel took over Atari in 1984, with a number of Commodore engineers, the company was in bad shape, and Shivji's proposed cheap, powerful home computer, codenamed 'Rock Bottom Price,' was seen as a solution to financial woes. While working for the newly founded Atari Corporation, Shivji was the primary designer of the Atari ST computer, among other projects.

Shivji became Atari's Vice President of Research and Development, and led a team of six engineers who designed the Atari 520ST computer. This work was completed in five months (July to December 1984). The prototype presentation at the January 1985 Las Vegas CES was successful for Atari, and the product revived the company. 

Shivji later led the design of the Atari TT before leaving Atari in 1990.

Post-Atari 
Kamran Elahian recruited Shivji for his 1989 startup company, Momenta. While there Shivji designed the Momenta Pen Computer, the first pentop computer and one of the first full sized tablet computers.

Shivji received seven patents between the years of 2000 and 2007.

References

External links
 Father of the ST
 A tribute to the ST
List of patents filed

1947 births
20th-century American engineers
20th-century Indian engineers
Alumni of the University of Southampton
American electrical engineers
Atari people
Commodore people
Indian Ismailis
American Ismailis
Tanzanian Ismailis
Indian electrical engineers
Indian emigrants to the United States
Living people
Stanford University alumni
Tanzanian emigrants to the United States
Tanzanian engineers
Tanzanian people of Indian descent